Gerald Bernard Lefcourt is an American criminal defense lawyer. He has represented a number of high-profile clients, including financier and registered sex offender Jeffrey Epstein, the Black Panthers, activist/author Abbie Hoffman, hotelier Harry Helmsley, former Speaker of the New York State Assembly Mel Miller, and actors Russell Crowe and Tracy Morgan.

Biography
Lefcourt graduated from Brooklyn Law School in the class of 1967, and heads a firm in New York City that specializes in criminal defense. A high-profile trial lawyer, Lefcourt is a leading spokesman of the defense bar, a past President of the National Association of Criminal Defense Lawyers and the New York Criminal Bar Association, and a founder of the New York State Association of Criminal Defense Lawyers. Lefcourt is also a lecturer and panelist and has authored publications on legal subjects including asset forfeiture, legal ethics, wire-tapping, plea bargaining, subpoenas to lawyers, and representation of grand jury witnesses.

He was named as among the best trial attorneys in New York by the New York Law Journal's 1983 "Who's Who in Criminal Defense Bar", and received the New York State Bar's Outstanding Practitioner Award in 1985 and 1993, and the National Association of Criminal Defense Lawyers' highest honor, the Robert C. Heeney Memorial Award, in 1993. In 1997 he was presented the Thurgood Marshall Lifetime Achievement Award by The New York State Association of Criminal Defense Lawyers.

Lefcourt was a featured personality in the 2006 documentary Giuliani Time. His victories have included a full acquittal of rap mogul and Murder Inc. founder Irv Gotti on federal money laundering charges. Lefcourt was an attorney of "aider and abettor" non-KMPG employee David Amir Makov, in the 2008 federal KPMG tax shelter fraud prosecution, believed to be the largest tax fraud case ever brought in the history of the United States.

In 2007, while criminal defense lawyers were finalizing Jeffrey Epstein's plea deal, Epstein donated $250,000 to the Washington-based Foundation for Criminal Justice, where Gerald Lefcourt was a board member in 2007, according to public filings.

Personal life
Lefcourt has been married twice. His first wife was Ilene Sackler Lefcourt, the daughter of Mortimer Sackler. Lefcourt has a son, Jeffrey Lefcourt, and two daughters, Karen Lefcourt and Alison Lefcourt. Lefcourt is married to Robin Lewis Lefcourt.

References

External links
Official website

Brooklyn Law School alumni
Criminal defense lawyers
New York (state) lawyers
Living people
Year of birth missing (living people)
Sackler family